Mulberry Creek is a stream in southern Ripley County in the U.S. state of Missouri.

Mulberry Creek was so named due to the abundance of mulberry trees in the area.

See also
List of rivers of Missouri

References

Rivers of Ripley County, Missouri
Rivers of Missouri